John Hicks (born 14 November 1938) is a New Zealand field hockey player. He competed in the men's tournament at the 1968 Summer Olympics.

References

External links
 

1938 births
Living people
New Zealand male field hockey players
Olympic field hockey players of New Zealand
Field hockey players at the 1968 Summer Olympics
Sportspeople from Suva
20th-century New Zealand people
21st-century New Zealand people